Roberto de Nobili (1577 – 16 January 1656) was an Italian Jesuit missionary to Southern India. He used a novel method of adaptation (accommodatio) to preach Christianity, adopting many local customs of India which were, in his view, not contrary to Christianity.

India 
Born in Montepulciano, Tuscany in September 1577, Roberto De Nobili arrived at the ports of the Portuguese in Goa and Bombay in western India, on 20 May 1605. It is probable that he met here Fr Thomas Stephens, SJ, who had arrived in Goa in 1579, and was probably in the process of composing his Khristapurana.

Roberto de Nobili, "nicknamed the White Brahman", was "the Jesuit missions to the court of the Mughal emperor Akbar".

After a short stay in Cochin at  Kerala, he took up residence in Madurai in Tamil Nadu in November 1606. He soon called himself a "teacher of wisdom" (தத்துவ போதகர்), and began to dress like a Sannyasi. Claiming noble parentage he approached high-caste people, and eagerly engaged in dialogue with Hindu scholars about the truths of Christianity.

De Nobili mastered Sanskrit, Telugu and Tamil languages and literature, with the help of his teacher, Shivadharma. Max Muller when speaking about De Nobili had quoted "I can only speak of him here as the First European Sanskrit scholar". As he expounded the Christian doctrine in Tamil he coined several words to communicate his message. He used the word "kovil" (கோவில்) for a place of worship, "arul" (அருள்) and "prasadam" (பிரசாதம்) for grace, "guru" (குரு) for priest or teacher, "Vedam" (வேதம்) for the Bible, "poosai" (பூசை) for Mass, etc.

He adopted also local Indian customs, such as shaving one's head and keeping only a tiny tuft. He wore a white dhoti and wooden sandals, to don the look of a sanyasin. Another symbol he embraced was the wearing of a three-stringed thread across the chest. He interpreted the three-stringed thread as representing the Holy Trinity, Father, Son and Holy Spirit.

He was one of the first Europeans to gain a deep understanding of Sanskrit and Tamil. He composed Catechisms, apologetic works and philosophic discourses in Tamil, and contributed greatly to the development of modern Tamil prose writing.

Controversies about his method

His method raised a fierce controversy among his fellow Jesuits and with the Archbishop of Goa Cristóvão de Sá e Lisboa. The dispute was settled by Pope Gregory XV with the Constitution Romanæ Sedis Antistes issued on 31 January 1623. The customs of the three-stringed thread, the tuft, the use of sandalwood paste on the forefront and baths were allowed, inasmuch they did not imply any superstitious ritual. The Pope invited the Indian neophytes to overcome their caste sensitivity and their contempt of the pariahs.

The Ezourvedam

Some have alleged that Roberto de Nobili was the author of a forged document written in French and purported to be a translation of an ancient Sanskrit scripture by the name of Ezourvedam. Max Mueller, a great Orientalist who edited the series The Sacred Books of the East has concluded convincingly that de Nobili did not author the forged work. Ludo Rocher has published a detailed study about the Ezourvedam which shows that the author of this text must have been a French missionary. He offered several names:

Urs App recently offered new evidence for the authorship of Jean Calmette (1692–1740).

Father Roberto de Nobili died in Mylapore near Chennai in Tamil Nadu on 16 January 1656 at the age of 79.

Legacy
 In Fall of 2013, Loyola University Chicago opened a residence hall called de Nobili Hall at its Lake Shore campus.  This five-story building houses approximately 200 first year students, the international learning community, and features a 350-seat dining hall.
 Ekaveera, a Telugu historical novel written by Jnanpith Award laureate Viswanatha Satyanarayana portrays a character based on Robert de Nobili. His character depicted in accordance to the closest historical evidences of Nobili's life. Robert de Nobili alias Tattvabodhaka swami preaching Christianity in the Hindu sanyasi attire and style of living will have a discourse and debate with one of the protagonists Ekaveera and loses it.
In Jharkhand, India there are 8 schools named after him as De Nobili School which is run by Jesuits. The schools are affiliated to the Council for Indian Certificate of Secondary Education (CISCE), New Delhi.

See also

Primary sources
Preaching wisdom to the wise: three treatises. Institute of Jesuit Sources, 2000.
 Nittiya cīvan̲a callāpam, Kaṭavuḷ nirn̲ayam. Tamil̲ Ilakkiyak Kal̲akam, 1964.
 Ñān̲ōpateca kur̲ippiṭamum irupatteṭṭu piracaṅkaṅkāḷum. Tamil̲ Ilakkiyak Kal̲akam, 1965.
 Tūṣaṇat tikkāram. Tamil̲ Ilakkiyak Kal̲akam, 1964.
 Ñāṉōpatēcam. Tamil̲ Ilakkiyak Kal̲akam, 1963.

Secondary sources
 Jesuits
 Matteo Ricci
 Malabar rites
 Roman Catholic Brahmin
 John de Britto, a later Jesuit missionary who followed de Nobili's method and was martyred in south India
 De Smet, Richard. “Robert de Nobili and Vedānta.” Vidyajyoti: Journal of Theological Reflection 40/8 (1976) 363-371.
 De Smet, Richard. “The Wide Range of De Nobili’s Doctrine.” Review of Soosai Arokiasamy, Dharma, Hindu and Christian, according to Roberto de Nobili (Rome, 1986). Vidyajyoti: Journal of Theological Reflection 52/3 (1988) 159-164.
 De Smet, Richard. "Robert de Nobili as Forerunner of Hindu-Christian Dialogue." Hindu-Christian Studies Bulletin 4 (1991) 1-9.
 J. Castets, "Robert de' Nobili" and Malabar Rites in the Catholic Encyclopedia (1911)
 Vincent Cronin, A Pearl to India: The Life of Roberto de Nobili (1959) 
 James MacCaffrey, History of the Catholic Church from the Renaissance to the French Revolution (1914),  chapter 5
 "Roman Catholic Brahmin" by Jyotsna Kamat
 European Missionaries and the Latin Church in India
 Who was Roberto de Nobili?
 The "Roman Brahmin"
 Moffett, Samuel Hugh. A History of Christianity in Asia, Vol. 2, 1500-1900, 2005, 
 Anchukandam, Thomas. Roberto de Nobili's Responsiso [1610]: a vindication of inculturation and adaption. Bangalore: Kristu Jyoti Publications, 1996.
 De Nobili Research Centre, Madras. Interculturation of religion: critical perspectives on Robert de Nobili's mission in India. Bangalore: Asian Trading Corporation, 2007.
 Bachmann, Peter R. Roberto Nobili: 1577-1656. Institum Historicum S.I., 1972.
 Sanfilippo, Matteo and Carlo Prezzolini. Roberto De Nobili (1577-1656) missionario gesuita poliziano: atti del convegno, Montepulciano, 20 ottobre 2007. Guerra, 2008.

References

1577 births
1656 deaths
17th-century Italian Jesuits
Tamil scholars of non-Tamil background
Jesuit missionaries in India
Italian translators
Italian Indologists
Linguists from Italy
Sanskrit scholars
Missionary linguists